Scelotes inornatus, the Durban dwarf burrowing skink or legless burrowing skink, is a species of lizard which is found in South Africa and Mozambique.

References

inornatus
Reptiles of South Africa
Reptiles described in 1849
Taxa named by Andrew Smith (zoologist)